Caerwys Rectory is a late Georgian house in Caerwys, Flintshire in northeast Wales. It is a listed building. It is a 3-bay house of 2 storeys with an attic. In the 1920s a verandah and bay windows were added. Caerwys Rectory was the birthplace of the antiquary Angharad Llwyd (1780–1866), daughter of the rector John Llwyd (1733–93).

References

Clergy houses in Wales
Georgian architecture in Wales
Houses in Flintshire
Grade II listed buildings in Flintshire
Grade II listed houses
Caerwys